Shiota Dam is a gravity dam located in Shimane Prefecture in Japan. The dam is used for irrigation. The catchment area of the dam is 1.3 km2. The dam impounds about 3  ha of land when full and can store 310 thousand cubic meters of water. The construction of the dam was started on 1980 and completed in 1988.

References

Dams in Shimane Prefecture
1988 establishments in Japan